Alejandro Muñóz Rocha (born February 17, 1992 in León, Guanajuato), better known as Alejandro Muñóz, is a professional Mexican footballer who currently plays for Reynosa F.C.

External links
 

Atlético Reynosa footballers
1992 births
Living people
Mexican footballers
Sportspeople from León, Guanajuato
Liga MX players
Association footballers not categorized by position